Edward Joseph Ashnault (born December 29, 1934) from was the head basketball coach for the Dickinson College Red Raiders (1964–67), Colgate Raiders (1967–72), and William & Mary Tribe (1972–74) He finished his two-year stint at W&M with a 10-12 Southern Conference record (19–35 overall).

References

1934 births
Living people
Basketball coaches from New Hampshire
Baseball players from New Hampshire
Colgate Raiders men's basketball coaches
Dickinson Red Devils baseball coaches
Dickinson Red Devils football coaches
Dickinson Red Devils men's basketball coaches
High school basketball coaches in Connecticut
High school football coaches in Connecticut
People from North Conway, New Hampshire
Plymouth State Panthers baseball players
Sportspeople from Carroll County, New Hampshire
William & Mary Tribe men's basketball coaches